Burton Elwood "Burt" Keeley (November 2, 1879 – May 3, 1952), was a Major League Baseball pitcher.

External links

1879 births
1952 deaths
Washington Senators (1901–1960) players
Baseball players from Illinois
Minor league baseball managers
Notre Dame Fighting Irish baseball players
Bloomington Blues players
Omaha Rourkes players
Chicago Keeleys players
People from Wilmington, Will County, Illinois